North Carter Mountain is a mountain located in Coos County, New Hampshire. The mountain is part of the Carter-Moriah Range of the White Mountains, which runs along the northern east side of Pinkham Notch.  North Carter is flanked to the northeast by Imp Mountain, and to the southwest by Middle Carter Mountain.

See also

 List of mountains of New Hampshire
 Four-thousand footers
 White Mountain National Forest

External links
 

Mountains of New Hampshire
Mountains of Coös County, New Hampshire
Mountains on the Appalachian Trail